Ramón Volcán (born 7 June 1959) is a Venezuelan former swimmer who competed in the 1976 Summer Olympics.

References

1956 births
Living people
Venezuelan male swimmers
Venezuelan male freestyle swimmers
Male backstroke swimmers
Male butterfly swimmers
Olympic swimmers of Venezuela
Swimmers at the 1976 Summer Olympics
Competitors at the 1974 Central American and Caribbean Games
Competitors at the 1978 Central American and Caribbean Games
Central American and Caribbean Games gold medalists for Venezuela
Central American and Caribbean Games medalists in swimming
20th-century Venezuelan people
21st-century Venezuelan people